Jaqueline is a hard rock band from Elverum, Norway.

History 
The trio, composed of Morten Wærhaug, Marius Drogsås Hagen and Bjarne Ryen Berg, formed in 1998 and released their debut album Idiots in March 2005. Idiots was given the score 5/6 in Norway's three biggest newspapers; one critic dubbed the album "Norwegian rock debut of the year".

In 2006 the band released their second album Reaping Machines and has received further critical acclaim in the Norwegian media. The video for the single Demon Seed has also been shown numerous times on the Norwegian television show Svisj.  the band is touring various places in Norway. Their latest album is called Cape Horn and was released in 2009.

Members 
 Morten Wærhaug - vocals, guitar, bass guitar
 Marius Drogsås Hagen - vocals, bass guitar, guitar
 Bjarne Ryen Berg - drums

Discography 
 Idiots (2005)
 Reaping Machines (2006)
 Cape Horn (2009)

References

External links 
 Official website

Norwegian hard rock musical groups
Musical groups established in 1998
1998 establishments in Norway
Musical groups from Hedmark
Musical groups from Elverum